Angiostoma is a genus of parasitic nematodes in the family Angiostomatidae.

Species 
Species in the genus Angiostoma include:

Parasitic species of turtles:
 Angiostoma carettae (Bursey & Manire, 2006) - from lungs of Caretta caretta, Florida.

Parasitic species of amphibians:
 Angiostoma aspersae (Yildirimhan, 2011) - Found in the stomach of Luschan's salamander carcasses 
 Angiostoma lamotheargumedoi (Falcón-Ordaz, Mendoza-Garfias, Windfield-Pérez, Parra-Olea & de León, 2008) - from salamander Pseudoeurycea mixteca, Mexico.
 Angiostoma onychodactyla (Bursey&  Goldberg, 2000) - from the Japanese Clawed Salamander Onychodactylus japonicus
 Angiostoma plethodontis (Chitwood, 1923) - from Plethodon cinereus and from Plethodon richmondi, Virginia, USA.

Parasitic species of gastropods (slugs and snails):
 Angiostoma asamati (Spiridonov, 1985) - from Turbomilax ferganus.
 Angiostoma aspersae (Morand, 1986) - from Cornu aspersum.
 Angiostoma coloaense (Van Luc, Spiridonov & Wilson, 2005 )- from Cyclophorus sp.
 Angiostoma dentifera (Mengert, 1953) - from Limax cinereoniger.
 Angiostoma kimmeriensis (Korol & Spiridonov, 1991) - from Oxychilus deilus.
 Angiostoma coloaense (P. V. Luc, S. E. Spiridonov & M. J. Wilson, 2005) - from Vietnam.
 Angiostoma limacis (Dujardin, 1845) - type species, from Arion ater.
 Angiostoma margaretae (Dujardin, 1845) - from Milax gagates, Britain and South Africa.
 Angiostoma milacis (Ivanova & Wilson, 2009) - from Milacidae and from Agriolimacidae, British Isles.
 Angiostoma schizoglossae (Morand & Barker, 1995) - from Schizoglossa novoseelandica, New Zealand.
 Angiostoma spiridonovi (Morand, 1992) - from Limax flavus.
 Angiostoma stammeri (Mengert, 1953) - from Limax cinereoniger and from Limax maximus.
 Angiostoma zonitidis (Ivanova & Wilson, 2009) - from Zonitidae, British Isles.

References 

Rhabditida genera
Angiostomatidae